Tredegar Ironsides Rugby Football Club is a rugby union, from Tredegar in South Wales. The club is a member of the Welsh Rugby Union and is a feeder club for the Newport Gwent Dragons.

The Ironsides were formed in 1946 from returning World War II  servicemen, after meeting in a local public house, the Talbot Hotel. Their first game was against a club from Rhymney, which Tredegar won.

Gareth S Kearney holds the record for most points in a season.

Notable former players
  Mark Jones
  Gareth S Kearney

External links
 Tredegar Ironsides RFC official site

References

Rugby clubs established in 1946
1946 establishments in Wales
Welsh rugby union teams
Sport in Blaenau Gwent
Tredegar